Robert Holzer (born 2 August 1966) is a retired German football player. He is currently a player agent.

References

External links 
 

1966 births
Living people
German footballers
Hertha BSC players
KFC Uerdingen 05 players
SC Fortuna Köln players
Bundesliga players
2. Bundesliga players
Footballers from Berlin
Association football defenders